Calliostoma occidentale, common name the boreal topsnail, is a species of sea snail, a marine gastropod mollusk in the family Calliostomatidae.

Description
The size of the shell varies between 6 mm and 17 mm. The shell is rather small, thin, imperforate, and opalescent with a shining surface. It is strongly sculptured above with smooth, yellowish spiral ribs, narrower than their interstices, numbering 3 or 4 on each of the 7 to 8 whorls. The periphery is very bluntly subangular. The base of the shell is nearly flat, with a few ribs around the axis and at the periphery, otherwise it is smooth. The acute spire is elevated. The apical whorl is minute, smooth, and rounded. Three whorls follow which are beaded on the spiral ribs. The sutures are impressed. The pearly aperture is rather rounded. The narrow columella is arcuate, not dentate or truncate at its base.

Distribution
This species has a wide distribution. It occurs in European waters, the Northwest Atlantic Ocean, Greenland, Scandinavia and in the Barents Sea at depths between 18 m and 1800 m.

References

Further reading
 Lovén, [S. L.] 1846. Nordens Hafs-Mollusker. Öfversigt af Kongl. Vetenskaps-Akademiens Förhandlingar 3: 134–160.
 Brunel, P., Bosse, L. & Lamarche, G. (1998). Catalogue of the marine invertebrates of the estuary and Gulf of St. Lawrence. Canadian Special Publication of Fisheries and Aquatic Sciences, 126. 405 p.
 de Kluijver, M.J.; Ingalsuo, S.S.; de Bruyne, R.H. (2000). Macrobenthos of the North Sea [CD-ROM]: 1. Keys to Mollusca and Brachiopoda. World Biodiversity Database CD-ROM Series. Expert Center for Taxonomic Identification (ETI): Amsterdam, The Netherlands. . 1 cd-rom pp
 Gofas, S.; Le Renard, J.; Bouchet, P. (2001). Mollusca, in: Costello, M.J. et al. (Ed.) (2001). European register of marine species: a check-list of the marine species in Europe and a bibliography of guides to their identification. Collection Patrimoines Naturels, 50: pp. 180–213 
 Trott, T.J. 2004. Cobscook Bay inventory: a historical checklist of marine invertebrates spanning 162 years. Northeastern Naturalist (Special Issue 2): 261–324

External links
 

occidentale
Gastropods described in 1842